Central Beskids may refer to:

 Central Beskids, a mountain range within the Outer Eastern Carpathians, also known as the Lower Beskids
 in Slovak terminology, the term Central Beskids is used as a designation for the Central section of the Western Beskids
 in translations of geographic names, the term Central Beskids is sometimes also used as synonym for the Middle Beskids, a descriptive term that has specific meanings in different classifications

See also 
 Eastern Beskids (disambiguation)
 Beskidian Foothills (disambiguation)
 Beskid (disambiguation)
 Outer Eastern Carpathians
 Outer Western Carpathians
 Western Beskids